Kindly Bent to Free Us is the third studio album by the progressive metal band Cynic. It was released on February 18, 2014, and is the final Cynic album with Sean Reinert, who left the band in September 2015 and died on January 24, 2020, as well as the final Cynic album with Sean Malone, who died on December 9, 2020.

History
The album was talked about in more detail during the writings sessions in February 2012. Masvidal told the Irish magazine Molten:

The album was made available for streaming on February 6, 2014.

Track listing
All music written by Cynic (Paul Masvidal, Sean Reinert, and Sean Malone)

Personnel

Musicians
 Paul Masvidal – vocals, guitars, keyboards
 Sean Malone – fretless bass, Chapman stick
 Sean Reinert – drums

Technical staff
 Jason Donaghy – engineering
 R. Walt Vincent – mixing
 Maor Appelbaum – mastering
 Robert Venosa – artwork

References

External links
 Blabbermouth: Tracklisting revealed for the following Cynic album

Cynic (band) albums
2014 albums
Progressive rock albums by American artists
Season of Mist albums